Roderick Macleod 4th of Cadboll (24 November 1786 – 13 March 1853) was a Scottish Whig politician.

Biography
Macleod was the Member of Parliament (MP) for Cromartyshire from 1818 to 1820, and for Sutherland from 14 September 1831 until 1837, when he stood down from the House of Commons at the 1837 general election, and ran for the constituency of Inverness Burghs which he represented from 1837 – 21 February 1840.

Macleod was Lord Lieutenant of Cromarty from 1833 until he died. His father lived to be a ripe old age so Macleod did not become head of the family until he was in his late 50s. He died nine years later in March 1853 and was succeeded by his eldest son, Robert Bruce Aeneas (1818–88).

Family
On 10 July 1813 Macleod married Isabella, daughter of William Cunninghame, merchant, of Lainshaw. They had five children: their eldest son was Robert Bruce Aeneas (1818-1888), their younger son was Henry Dunning Macleod (1821-1902), who became a distinguished writer on political economy, and three daughters: Margaret, Elizabeth, and Anna Maria.

Notes

References

. Endnotes

GB232/D63: MacLeod family of Cadboll papers, 1867-1970

External links 
 

1786 births
1853 deaths
Whig (British political party) MPs for Scottish constituencies
Members of the Parliament of the United Kingdom for Scottish constituencies
UK MPs 1818–1820
UK MPs 1831–1832
UK MPs 1832–1835
UK MPs 1835–1837
Lord-Lieutenants of Cromarty